Josep Jufré Pou (born 5 August 1975) is a Spanish former professional road bicycle racer, who competed as a professional between 1999 and 2011.

Major results

2001
 1st Stage 5 GP do Minho
 3rd Overall GP Sport Noticias
2002
 1st Clásica a los Puertos de Guadarrama
2003
 2nd Overall Setmana Catalana de Ciclisme
 4th Overall Vuelta a la Rioja
 4th Overall Vuelta a Aragón
 5th Overall Tour de Langkawi
2004
 3rd Overall Vuelta a la Rioja
 3rd Overall Setmana Catalana de Ciclisme
 6th Overall Escalada a Montjuïc
 8th Overall Volta a Catalunya
 10th Overall Vuelta a Aragón
2005
 6th Overall Vuelta a Burgos
2007
 6th Hel van het Mergelland
2008
 4th Overall Volta a Catalunya
 8th Klasika Primavera
2009
 10th Clásica de Almería
2010
 5th Overall Vuelta a Murcia

Grand Tour general classification results timeline

References

External links

Cyclists from Catalonia
Spanish male cyclists
1975 births
Living people
People from Osona
Sportspeople from the Province of Barcelona
21st-century Spanish people